West Marion is a census-designated place (CDP) in McDowell County, North Carolina, United States. The population was 1,348 at the 2010 census, down from 1,556 in 2000.

Geography
West Marion is located at  (35.659110, -82.021113).

Demographics

As of the census of 2000, there were 1,556 people, 677 households, and 459 families residing in the CDP. The population density was 831.2 people per square mile (321.3/km). There were 731 housing units at an average density of 390.5 per square mile (150.9/km). The racial makeup of the CDP was 91.26% White, 5.14% African American, 0.45% Native American, 0.13% Asian, 1.67% from other races, and 1.35% from two or more races. Hispanic or Latino of any race were 2.19% of the population.

There were 677 households, out of which 28.1% had children under the age of 18 living with them, 51.7% were married couples living together, 11.8% had a female householder with no husband present, and 32.2% were non-families. 27.3% of all households were made up of individuals, and 12.1% had someone living alone who was 65 years of age or older. The average household size was 2.30 and the average family size was 2.76.

In the CDP, the population was spread out, with 22.1% under the age of 18, 8.6% from 18 to 24, 28.1% from 25 to 44, 25.3% from 45 to 64, and 15.8% who were 65 years of age or older. The median age was 38 years. For every 100 females, there were 85.2 males. For every 100 females age 18 and over, there were 83.9 males.

The median income for a household in the CDP was $26,151, and the median income for a family was $31,953. Males had a median income of $22,263 versus $19,816 for females. The per capita income for the CDP was $15,087. About 16.3% of families and 17.8% of the population were below the poverty line, including 33.4% of those under age 18 and 17.6% of those age 65 or over.

References

Census-designated places in McDowell County, North Carolina
Census-designated places in North Carolina